Weaver Cave, also known as Inlet Cave, is a  long ponor cave in southwest Slovenia. It runs from the west (downstream) side of the Rak Škocjan Valley, where it has two entrances, and continues into Planina Cave. It is traversed by Rak Creek, part of the Ljubljanica source system. It thus forms part of the hydrological connection between Cerknica Polje and Planina Polje. Due to sumps, the stream of the Rak is very difficult to follow and was explored by divers only in 1974, when the majority of the cave was discovered in the course of a rescue expedition, and in August 2012.

The cave was named after a stalagmite reminiscent of a weaver. An old story says that he was turned to stone because he worked on Sunday, the Lord's Day. The first description of Weaver Cave was published in 1687 by Johann Weikhard von Valvasor in the Philosophical Transactions of the Royal Society. He also published an engraving of it. The cave has also been depicted by other artists, including Franz Goldenstein (1808–1878) in the 1850s. His painting of the Great Natural Bridge of Rak Škocjan as seen from the inside of the cave is on display in the National Gallery of Slovenia.

Gallery

References

External links

Weaver Cave. Statistical information. Cave E-Cadastre. 
Rak Škocjan - Weaver Cave. Virtual panorama (surround photography) in front of the main entrance. Burger.si. (Rich media - may be viewed with QuickTime).

Caves of Inner Carniola
Ljubljanica basin
Municipality of Cerknica
Articles containing video clips